Bellshill Maternity Hospital was a health facility at Bellshill in North Lanarkshire, Scotland.

History
The hospital was built as a poor law hospital in the 1870s. It became an infectious diseases hospital in 1892 and a maternity hospital in 1917. An early obstetric flying squad was established at the hospital in the 1930s. It joined the National Health Service in 1948. A modern facility, designed by Gillespie, Kidd & Coia was opened by the Queen in July 1962. After maternity services transferred to Wishaw General Hospital in 2001, the buildings were demolished in 2003 and the site was subsequently redeveloped for residential use.

Famous births
Famous people born in the hospital include:
Robin Cook, politician
Sheena Easton, singer
Ally McCoist, footballer
Paul McGuigan, film maker
Lord Reid, politician
Sharleen Spiteri, singer-songwriter; guitarist; lead vocalist of the Scottish pop-rock band Texas

References 

Hospitals in North Lanarkshire
Defunct hospitals in Scotland
Bellshill
Maternity hospitals in the United Kingdom
Hospitals established in the 1870s
NHS Scotland hospitals
Hospitals disestablished in 2001
1870s establishments in Scotland
Hospital buildings completed in 1962
2001 disestablishments in Scotland